C. echinata  may refer to:
 Caesalpinia echinata, the brazilwood, pau-Brasil or pernambuco, a Brazilian timber tree species
 Carex echinata, the star sedge or little prickly sedge, a plant species native to North and Central America and parts of Eurasia
 Cucumaria echinata, a sea cucumber species found in the Bay of Bengal

See also
 Echinata